Alfatradiol, also known as 17α-estradiol and sold under the brand names Avicis, Avixis, Ell-Cranell Alpha, and Pantostin, is a weak estrogen and 5α-reductase inhibitor medication which is used topically in the treatment of pattern hair loss (androgenic alopecia or pattern baldness) in men and women. It is a stereoisomer of the endogenous steroid hormone and estrogen 17β-estradiol (or simply estradiol).

Medical uses
Alfatradiol is used in form of an ethanolic solution for topical application on the scalp. Similarly to other drugs against alopecia, topical or oral, it has to be applied continuously to prevent further hair loss. Regrowth of hair that was already lost is only possible to a limited extent. In general, advanced alopecia does not respond well to medical treatment, which has historically been thought to be a consequence of the hair roots being lost.

A university-led study (including several authors who are advisors to companies such as Pfizer) in 103 women comparing alfatradiol to minoxidil, another topical hair loss treatment, found the latter to be more effective. In contrast to minoxidil, alfatradiol did not result in an increase of hair density or thickness, but only in slowing down or stabilization of hair loss in this study. In an earlier study, no systemic side effects were noted, and 17α-estradiol was found to reduce androgenic hair loss, though it was not effective at growing new hair.

Other efforts of alfatradiol had been directed at neurodegenerative diseases including Parkinson's.

Other hair loss medications include ketoconazole, finasteride, and dutasteride.

Contraindications
Nothing is known about the use of alfatradiol during pregnancy or lactation, or in patients under 18 years of age. The package leaflet recommends against using it under these circumstances.

Side effects
Local burning or itching is not an effect of alfatradiol, but of the ethanol in the solvent. The solution can stimulate sebum production.

Pharmacology

Pharmacodynamics

Alfatradiol (17α-estradiol) is distinguished from estradiol (17β-estradiol), the predominant sex hormone in females, only by the stereochemistry of the carbon atom 17. In contrast to 17β-estradiol, 17α-estradiol, while it still binds to the estrogen receptor, has less or no feminizing estrogenic activity depending on its dosage and the tissue it is affecting. Alfatradiol acts as an inhibitor of the enzyme 5α-reductase, which is responsible for the activation of testosterone to dihydrotestosterone, and which plays a role in regulating hair growth. 17α-Estradiol has been studied as a therapeutic with potential to treat Alzheimer's and Parkinson's disease and other patients with neurodegenerative diseases. 17α-Estradiol (as the sodium salt of its sulfated form) is a minor component (<10%) of hormone replacement products (such as conjugated estrogens, brand name Premarin), which have been studied and/or marketed in women and men since the 1930s. A survey of the effects of various forms of 17α-estradiol in humans on biochemical parameters, efficacy, estrogenicity, metabolism, safety, and tolerability has been published.

Alfatradiol binds to the ERα and ERβ with 58% and 11% of the relative binding affinity of 17β-estradiol. However, it has 100-fold lower estrogenic activity relative to estradiol, which may in part be due to differences in the intrinsic activity of the two compounds. On the other hand, alfatradiol has been found to bind to and activate the brain-expressed ER-X with a greater potency than estradiol, indicating that it may be the predominant endogenous ligand for the receptor. In contrast to estradiol, alfatradiol is not a ligand of the G protein-coupled estrogen receptor (affinity >10 μM).

Society and culture

Generic names
Alfatradiol is the generic name of the drug and its . It is also known as 17α-estradiol.

Brand names
Alfatradiol is marketed under the brand names Avicis, Avixis, Ell-Cranell Alpha, and Pantostin.

Availability
Alfatradiol is available in Germany and several Latin American countries, including Argentina, Brazil, and Mexico.

Research
Alfatradiol administered systemically improved metabolic function, reduced insulin resistance, decreased intra-abdominal fat, and decreased inflammation in old male mice without inducing feminization, suggesting potential usefulness in the treatment of type 2 diabetes.

See also 
 Alfatradiol/dexamethasone (Ell-Cranell Dexa)
 Estradiol 17α-dehydrogenase
 List of estrogens

References 

5α-Reductase inhibitors
Diols
Estranes
Estrogens
Hair loss medications
Phenols